Cecil Rhodes "Tex" Bradford (August 15, 1899 – January 27, 1975) was a college football player and a medical doctor.

Early years
Bradford was born on August 15, 1899 in Mansfield, Texas to James Frederick Bradford and Susan Virginia Hobson.

College football
Tex was a prominent tackle for the TCU Horned Frogs of Texas Christian University; and Dan McGugin's Vanderbilt Commodores of Vanderbilt University from 1921 to 1922, winning Southern championships both his years there. He graduated from Vanderbilt with an M. D. in 1924.

TCU
Bradford first played for Texas Christian University, making All-Texas teams.

Vanderbilt

1921
In his first game with the Commodores, Tex was forced to wear civilian shoes until Vanderbilt received its order for cleats big enough to fit his feet. Vanderbilt later played a game against Texas at the Texas State Fair. Vandy would upset the powerful Longhorns eleven 20 to 0.  The first score came on a third down at some point near the middle of the second quarter. Texas' Ivan Robertson, with the Commodores' Tom Ryan and Bradford running after him, threw a pass not near a single Longhorn; which was intercepted by Vanderbilt's captain Pink Wade. Wade returned the interception for 65 yards and the touchdown.

1922
Tex was a starter for the scoreless tie with the Michigan Wolverines at the dedication of Dudley Field in 1922. His defense that day received praise. "Thousands of cheering Vanderbilt fans inspired the surge of center Alf Sharp, guard Gus Morrow, tackle Tex Bradford, and end Lynn Bomar, who stopped Michigan cold in four attempts." He was elected to four All-Southern teams in 1922.

To the woe of Commodore fans, on October 10, 1923 Bradford was ruled ineligible on grounds of having already played four years of college athletics. His loss was lamented so near the eve of the Michigan game, for his line work against them was "materially responsible" for the 0 to 0 tie the year before.

References

American football tackles
Vanderbilt Commodores football players
1899 births
1975 deaths
Sportspeople from Texas
Players of American football from Texas
People from Mansfield, Texas
Vanderbilt University School of Medicine alumni
Physicians from Texas
TCU Horned Frogs football players